Konka can refer to:
 Konka (river) in Ukraine
 Konka Group, a Chinese electronics company